St. Pancras South East was a borough constituency represented in the House of Commons of the Parliament of the United Kingdom. It elected one Member of Parliament (MP) by the first past the post system of election. It was created in 1918 by the division of St Pancras South into South East and South West divisions, and abolished in 1950.

Politics and history of the constituency

Boundaries 

1918–1950: The Metropolitan Borough of St Pancras wards of six and eight, and the part of ward number three lying to the south and east of a line running along the middle of Camden Road from a point where that road is intersected by the eastern boundary of the metropolitan borough to the point where that road crosses the Regent's Canal and thence westward along the middle of that canal to the western boundary of Ward number three.

In 1950 the constituency was split between Holborn and St Pancras South (wards Six and Eight) and St Pancras North (ward Three).

Members of Parliament

Elections in the 1910s 

 Some records describe Adams as an Independent, while others state that Adams, Hopkins and Reiss all supported the Coalition Government. One states that Coalition Government endorsement was initially issued to Reiss but subsequently withdrawn.

However, Craig records that Adams initially received the coupon with Liberal endorsement, and this was later withdrawn, with Craig claiming to be free of any party allegiance and previously having been outspokenly against the coalition.

Elections in the 1920s

Elections in the 1930s

Elections in the 1940s

References 

Parliamentary constituencies in London (historic)
Constituencies of the Parliament of the United Kingdom established in 1918
Constituencies of the Parliament of the United Kingdom disestablished in 1950
Politics of the London Borough of Camden